Krzyżowniki may refer to the following places in Poland:
Krzyżowniki, part of the Jeżyce district of Poznań
Krzyżowniki, Kępno County
Krzyżowniki, Poznań County